Rubén Blanco Veiga (born 25 July 1995) is a Spanish professional footballer who plays as a goalkeeper for Ligue 1 club Olympique de Marseille on loan from RC Celta de Vigo.

He made his professional debut for Celta in La Liga at the age of 17, and went on to play 142 games for the club.

Club career
Born in Mos, Province of Pontevedra, Galicia, Blanco finished his youth career with local RC Celta de Vigo. He played his first games as a senior at only 16, with the B team in the Segunda División B.

On 26 May 2013, two months shy of his 18th birthday, Blanco made his main squad – and La Liga – debut, entering the pitch at half-time after Javi Varas suffered a serious shoulder injury and keeping a clean sheet in a 2–0 away win against Real Valladolid. He retained his position for the following match, the last of the season, helping to a 1–0 home victory over RCD Espanyol as Celta managed to stay up, being the first team above the relegation zone.

Blanco made eight Copa del Rey appearances in 2015–16 in a semi-final run before a 6–2 aggregate loss to Sevilla FC. On the league front, he played as many matches as back-up to Sergio Álvarez. On 3 January 2016, he received a straight red card for a foul on Nordin Amrabat in a 2–0 loss at Málaga CF.

In 2016–17, Blanco made his continental debut as the side reached the semi-finals of the UEFA Europa League. He played four group games, beginning with the 2–2 draw against AFC Ajax at Balaídos on 20 October. After five appearances of the following campaign's domestic league, he succeeded Álvarez as starting goalkeeper under manager Juan Carlos Unzué. He was sent off on 16 October 2017 for taking down Jonathan Calleri in a 5–2 away win over UD Las Palmas.

Blanco signed a new contract in June 2018, running until 2023. On 9 November 2019, in a 4–1 away loss to FC Barcelona, he surpassed 1950s player Padrón as the youngest goalkeeper in club history to reach 100 games; both men were 24.

At the start of 2021–22, Blanco lost his place to veteran Matías Dituro, whom he had previously displaced from Celta's B-team. Thus, on 20 July 2022, he was loaned to Olympique de Marseille in France on a season-long loan.

Career statistics

Club

Honours
Spain U21
UEFA European Under-21 Championship runner-up: 2017

References

External links

1995 births
Living people
People from Vigo (comarca)
Sportspeople from the Province of Pontevedra
Spanish footballers
Footballers from Galicia (Spain)
Association football goalkeepers
La Liga players
Segunda División B players
Tercera División players
Celta de Vigo B players
RC Celta de Vigo players
Ligue 1 players
Olympique de Marseille players
Spain youth international footballers
Spain under-21 international footballers
Spanish expatriate footballers
Expatriate footballers in France
Spanish expatriate sportspeople in France